"The Next Movement" is a single by The Roots from their fourth album Things Fall Apart (1999). The track features scratching from DJ Jazzy Jeff and background vocals from R&B duo Jazzyfatnastees. Randall Roberts of the Riverfront Times called it "one of the best singles of the '90s". Charles Stone III directed the song's music video.

Track listing 
"The Next Movement" (radio version) – 3:45
"You Got Me (The Q-Cru Radio Mix)" (featuring Erykah Badu) – 3:45
"Without a Doubt" (radio version) – 3:08
"The Next Movement" (instrumental) – 4:30

References

External links 
"The Next Movement" music video at YouTube
"The Next Movement" at Sessions@AOL

1999 singles
1999 songs
The Roots songs
MCA Records singles